Yakshimbetovo (Yaqşembät) is a rural locality (a village) in Mrakovsky Selsoviet, Kugarchinsky District, Bashkortostan, Russia. The population was 190 as of 2010. There are 2 streets.

Geography 
Yakshimbetovo is located 9 km southwest of Mrakovo (the district's administrative centre) by road. Novopokrovskoye is the nearest rural locality.

References 

Rural localities in Kugarchinsky District